TATA-binding protein-associated factor 2N is a protein that in humans is encoded by the TAF15 gene.

Function 

Initiation of transcription by RNA polymerase II requires the activities of more than 70 polypeptides. The protein that coordinates these activities is transcription factor IID (TFIID), which binds to the core promoter to position the polymerase properly, serves as the scaffold for assembly of the remainder of the transcription complex, and acts as a channel for regulatory signals. TFIID is composed of the TATA-binding protein (TBP) and a group of evolutionarily conserved proteins known as TBP-associated factors or TAFs. TAFs may participate in basal transcription, serve as coactivators, function in promoter recognition or modify general transcription factors (GTFs) to facilitate complex assembly and transcription initiation. This gene encodes a subunit of TFIID present in a subset of TFIID complexes. Translocations involving chromosome 17 and chromosome 9, where the gene for the nuclear receptor CSMF is located, result in a gene fusion product that is an RNA binding protein associated with a subset of extraskeletal myxoid chondrosarcomas. Two transcripts encoding different isoforms have been identified.

Interactions 

TAF15 has been shown to interact with:

 POLR2C, 
 POLR2E, 
 POLR2G,
 SAFB, 
 TAF11, 
 TAF13, 
 TAF5, 
 TAF7,  and
 TATA binding protein

References

Further reading

External links